Erik Lee Holt (born September 6, 1996) is an American soccer player who plays as a defender for Real Salt Lake in Major League Soccer.

Career

College and amateur 
Holt played four years of college soccer at the University of California, Los Angeles between 2015 and 2018, scoring 1 goal and tallying 5 assists in 71 appearances.

Holt also played with USL Premier Development League sides San Diego Zest and FC Golden State Force.

Professional 
On January 3, 2019, Holt signed as a Homegrown Player for Real Salt Lake of Major League Soccer. Holt made his MLS debut on March 23, 2019, for Real Salt Lake against Los Angeles FC.

He scored his first MLS goal on June 18, 2021, against Vancouver Whitecaps FC.

Honors

Real Monarchs

USL Cup 2019

References

External links 
 
 Erik Holt | Real Salt Lake

1996 births
Living people
American soccer players
Association football defenders
FC Golden State Force players
Homegrown Players (MLS)
Major League Soccer players
MLS Next Pro players
Real Salt Lake players
Real Monarchs players
San Diego Zest players
Soccer players from San Diego
UCLA Bruins men's soccer players
United States men's youth international soccer players
USL Championship players
USL League Two players